Porvorim Assembly constituency is one of the 40 Legislative Assembly constituencies of Goa state in India. Porvorim is also one of the 20 constituencies falling under the North Goa Lok Sabha constituency.

It is part of North Goa district.

Members of Legislative Assembly

Election results

2022 result

2017

See also
 List of constituencies of the Goa Legislative Assembly
 North Goa district

References

External link
  

North Goa district
Porvorim
Assembly constituencies of Goa